Fort Collins, Colorado is a center of media in north-central Colorado. The following is a list of media outlets based in the city.

Print

Magazines
Fort Collins Senior Voice, seniors' lifestyle, monthly
The New Scene, entertainment and lifestyle in the Northern Colorado Area, monthly
(SALT), art and entertainment, monthly
College Avenue, student magazine, arts and entertainment, monthly

Newspapers
The Fort Collins Coloradoan is the city's primary newspaper, published daily. Other newspapers published in the city include

Rocky Mountain Collegian, Colorado State University student newspaper, four days a week
North Forty News, events, news, arts and more, monthly

Radio
Fort Collins is a principal city of the Fort Collins-Greeley radio market. In its Fall 2013 ranking of radio markets by population, Arbitron ranked Fort Collins-Greeley 117th in the United States. Due to Fort Collins's proximity to Denver, local listeners can also receive the signal of most radio stations broadcasting from the Denver radio market.

The following is a list of radio stations that broadcast from and/or are licensed to Fort Collins.

AM

FM

Television
Fort Collins is in the Denver television market. Due to Fort Collins's proximity to Cheyenne, Wyoming, local viewers can also receive the signal of several television stations broadcasting in the Cheyenne television market.

The following is a list of television stations that broadcast from and/or are licensed to Fort Collins.

References

Fort Collins